The cent, the United States one-cent coin (symbol: ¢), often called the "penny", is a unit of currency equaling one one-hundredth of a United States dollar. It has been the lowest face-value physical unit of U.S. currency since the abolition of the half-cent in 1857 (the abstract mill, which has never been minted, equal to a tenth of a cent, continues to see limited use in the fields of taxation and finance). The first U.S. cent was produced in 1787, and the cent has been issued primarily as a copper or copper-plated coin throughout its history. Due to inflation, pennies have lost virtually all their purchasing power and are often viewed as an expensive burden to businesses, banks, government (especially mints) and the public in general.

The penny is issued in its current form as the Lincoln cent, with its obverse featuring the profile of President Abraham Lincoln since 1909, the centennial of his birth. From 1959 (the sesquicentennial of Lincoln's birth) to 2008, the reverse featured the Lincoln Memorial. Four different reverse designs in 2009 honored Lincoln's 200th birthday and a new, "permanent" reverse – the Union Shield – was introduced in 2010. The coin is 0.75 inches (19.05 mm) in diameter and 0.0598 inches (1.52 mm) in thickness. The current copper-plated zinc cent issued since 1982 weighs 2.5 grams, while the previous 95% copper cent still found in circulation weighed 3.11 g (see further below).

The U.S. Mint's official name for the coin is "cent" and the U.S. Treasury's official name is "one cent piece". The colloquial term penny derives from the British coin of the same name, which occupies a similar place in the British system. Pennies is the plural form (not to be confused with pence, which refers to the unit of currency).

In the early 2010s, the price of metal used to make pennies rose to a noticeable cost to the mint which peaked at more than $0.02, a negative seigniorage, for the $0.01 face-value coin. This pushed the mint to look for alternative metals again for the coin, and also brought the debate about eliminating the coin into more focus.  there are no firm plans to do so.

History of composition
The composition of the penny has varied over time:

The isotope composition of early coins spanning the period 1828 to 1843 reflects the copper from Cornish ores from England, while coins after 1850 reflect the Keweenaw Peninsula, Michigan ores, a finding consistent with historical records.

In 1943, at the peak of World War II, zinc-coated steel cents were made for a short time because of war demands for copper. A few copper cents from 1943 were produced from 1942 planchets remaining in the bins. Similarly, some 1944 steel cents have been confirmed. From 1944 to 1946, salvaged ammunition shells made their way into the minting process, and it was not uncommon to see coins featuring streaks of brass or having a considerably darker finish than other issues.

During the early 1970s, the price of copper rose to the point where the cent contained almost one cent's worth of copper. This led the Mint to test alternative metals, including aluminum and bronze-clad steel. Aluminum was chosen, and over 1.5 million samples of the 1974 aluminum cent were struck before ultimately being rejected.

The cent's composition was changed in 1982 because the value of the copper in the coin started to rise above one cent. Some 1982 cents used the 97.5% zinc composition, while others used the 95% copper composition. With the exception of 2009 bicentennial cents minted specifically for collectors, United States cents minted after 1982 have been zinc with copper plating. The bronze and copper cents can be distinguished from the newer zinc cents by dropping the coins on a solid surface, or by flipping them in the air with your thumb. The predominantly zinc coins make a lower-pitched "clunk" when hitting the surface, and make no sound when flipped in the air; while the copper coins produce a higher-pitched ringing sound. In addition, a full 50-cent roll of pre-1982/3 coins weighs  compared to a post-1982–83 roll which weighs .

Designs
The coin has gone through several designs over its two-hundred-year time frame. Until 1857 it was about the size of the current U.S. dollar coins (Susan B. Anthony through present dollars). Shown below are the different cent designs that have been produced; mintage figures can be found at United States cent mintage figures.

Large cents:
 Flowing Hair Chain 1793
 Flowing Hair Wreath 1793
 Liberty Cap 1793–1796
 Draped Bust 1796–1807
 Classic Head 1808–1814
 Coronet 1816–1839
 Braided Hair 1839–1857, 1868 (not a regular issue)
Small cents:
 Flying Eagle cent (1856–1858)
 Indian Head cent (1859–1909)
 Lincoln cent (1909–present)
 Lincoln Wheat (1909–1958)
 Lincoln Memorial (1959–2008)
 Lincoln Bicentennial 4 reverse designs (2009)
 Lincoln Union Shield (2010–present)

Throughout its history, the Lincoln cent has featured several typefaces for the date, but most of the digits have been old-style numerals, except with the 4 and 8 neither ascending nor descending. The only significant divergence is that the small 3 was non-descending (the same size as a 0, 1, or 2) in the early history, before switching to a descending, large 3 for the year 1934 and then permanently in 1943. Similarly, the digit 5 was small and non-descending up to 1945.

Lincoln cent

The Lincoln cent is the current one-cent coin of the U.S. It was adopted in 1909 (which would have been Lincoln's 100th birthday), replacing the Indian Head cent. Its reverse was changed in 1959 from a wheat-stalks design to a design which includes the Lincoln Memorial (to commemorate Lincoln's sesquicentennial) and was replaced again in 2009 with four new designs to commemorate Lincoln's bicentennial. There are more one-cent coins produced than any other denomination, which makes the Lincoln cent a familiar item. In its lifespan, this coin has weathered both world wars, one of which temporarily changed its composition as part of the war effort. The obverse design is the longest produced for any circulating American coin.

History

When the Lincoln one-cent coin made its initial appearance in 1909, it marked a radical departure from the accepted styling of United States coinage, as it was the first regular coin to bear a portrait other than the mythical Liberty which appeared on most pre-1909 regular coins. Previously, a strong feeling had prevailed against using portraits on coins in the United States, but public sentiment stemming from the 100th anniversary celebration of Abraham Lincoln's birth proved stronger than the long-standing tradition.

A variety of privately minted tokens bearing Lincoln's image circulated as one-cent pieces during Lincoln's presidency; legitimate coinage had become scarce during the Civil War. These early tokens undoubtedly influenced the denomination, appearance, size, and composition of Lincoln cents.

Theodore Roosevelt, the 26th U.S. president, thought American coins were so common and uninspiring that he attempted to get the motto "In God We Trust" removed as offending religion. Roosevelt had the opportunity to pose for a young Lithuanian-born Jew, Victor David Brenner, who, since arriving nineteen years earlier in the United States had become one of the nation's premier medalists. Roosevelt had learned of Brenner's talents in a settlement house on New York City's Lower East Side and was immediately impressed with a bas-relief that Brenner had made of Lincoln, based on a Mathew Brady photograph. Roosevelt, who considered Lincoln the savior of the Union and the greatest Republican president, and who also considered himself Lincoln's political heir, ordered the new Lincoln cent to be based on Brenner's work and to be released just in time to commemorate Lincoln's 100th birthday in 1909. The likeness of President Lincoln on the obverse of the coin is an adaptation of a plaque Brenner created several years earlier which had come to the attention of President Roosevelt in New York.

In addition to the prescribed elements on U.S. coins—LIBERTY and the date—the motto In God We Trust appeared for the first time on a coin of this denomination. The United States Congress passed the Act of March 3, 1865, authorizing the use of this motto on U.S. coins, during Lincoln's tenure in office.

Even though no legislation was required for the new design, approval of the Secretary of the Treasury was necessary to make the change. Franklin MacVeagh gave his approval on July 14, 1909, and not quite three weeks later, on August 2, the new coin was released to the public.

In 1918, after the controversy over Brenner's name and initials on the reverse had died down, his initials were placed on the obverse with no further controversy. They are to be found in minute form on the rim of the bust, just under the shoulder of Lincoln.

Wheat cent (1909–1958)
A study of three potential reverses resulted in the approval of a very simple design bearing two wheatheads in memorial style. Between these, in the center of the coin, are the denomination and UNITED STATES OF AMERICA, while curving around the upper border is the national motto, E Pluribus Unum, Latin for "Out of Many, One".

The original model bore Brenner's name on the reverse, curving along the rim below UNITED STATES OF AMERICA. Before the coins were issued, however, the initials "VDB" were substituted because officials at the United States Mint felt the name was too prominent. After the coin was released, many protested that even the initials were conspicuous and detracted from the design. Because the coin was in great demand, and because to make a change would have required halting production, the decision was made to eliminate the initials entirely.

Thus in 1909 the U.S. had six different cents: the 1909 and 1909-S Indian Head cents, and four Lincoln coins: 1909 VDB, 1909-S VDB, 1909 and 1909-S. In all cases the Philadelphia mintages far exceeded the San Francisco issues. While the smallest mintage is the '09-S Indian, the '09-S VDB is the key Lincoln date, and hence is most valuable. Its mintage of 484,000 is only 1.7% of the plain V.D.B.

Lincoln Memorial cent (1959–2008)

On February 12, 1959, a revised reverse design was introduced as part of the 150th anniversary of Lincoln's birth. No formal competition was held. Frank Gasparro, then Assistant Engraver at the Philadelphia Mint, prepared the winning entry, selected from a group of 23 models that the engraving staff at the Mint had been asked to present for consideration. Again, only the approval of the Secretary of the Treasury was necessary to make the change because the design had been in use for more than the required 25 years. The imposing marble Lincoln Memorial provides the central motif, with the legends E Pluribus Unum and UNITED STATES OF AMERICA completing the design, together with the denomination. The initials "FG" appear on the right, near the shrubbery. This series is noteworthy for having the image of Abraham Lincoln both on the obverse and reverse, as his likeness can be discerned at the center of the memorial on the reverse.

Lincoln Bicentennial cents (2009)
The Presidential $1 Coin Act of 2005 required that the cent's reverse be redesigned in 2009. This resulted in the mintage of four different coins showing scenes from Abraham Lincoln's life in honor of the bicentennial of his birth.

These four designs, unveiled September 22, 2008, at a ceremony held at the Lincoln Memorial on the National Mall in Washington, D.C., are:
 Birth and early childhood in Kentucky: this design features a log cabin and Lincoln's birth year 1809. It was designed by Richard Masters and sculpted by Jim Licaretz. This cent was released into circulation on Lincoln's 200th birthday, February 12, 2009, at a special ceremony at LaRue County High School in Hodgenville, Kentucky, Lincoln's birthplace. The mintage was extremely low compared to prior years (see Lincoln cent mintage figures). It has been nicknamed the "Log Cabin Penny".
 Formative years in Indiana: this design features a young Lincoln reading while taking a break from rail splitting. It was designed and sculpted by Charles Vickers. Nicknamed the "Indiana Penny", it was released on May 14, 2009.
 Professional life in Illinois: this design features a young professional Lincoln standing before the Illinois State Capitol, in Springfield. It was designed by Joel Iskowitz and sculpted by Don Everhart. Nicknamed the "Illinois Penny", it was released on August 13, 2009.
 Presidency in Washington, D.C.: this design features the half-completed Capitol dome. It was designed by Susan Gamble and sculpted by Joseph Menna. This fourth cent was released to the public on November 12, 2009. U.S. Mint released collector's sets containing this design in copper prior to the public launch of this design in zinc.

Special 2009 cents struck for sale in sets to collectors had the metallic copper content of cents minted in 1909 (95% copper, 5% tin and zinc). Those struck for circulation retained the normal composition of a zinc core coated with copper.

Union shield cent (2010–present)
The 2005 act that authorized the redesign for the Bicentennial stated that another redesigned reverse for the Lincoln cent will be minted which "shall bear an image emblematic of President Lincoln's preservation of the United States of America as a single and united country". Eighteen designs were proposed for the reverse of the 2010 cent. On April 16, 2009, the Commission of Fine Arts (CFA) met and selected a design that showed 13 wheat sheaves bound together with a ring symbolizing American unity as one nation. Later this design was withdrawn because it was similar to coinage issued in Germany in the 1920s. The Citizens Coinage Advisory Committee later met and chose a design showing a Union shield with  superimposed in a scroll; E Pluribus Unum was also depicted in the upper portion of the shield. In June 2009 the CFA met again and chose a design featuring a modern rendition of the American flag. As a part of the release ceremony for the last of the 2009 cents on November 12, the design for the 2010 cent was announced. The design chosen was the one that was chosen earlier by the CCAC. According to the Mint, the 13 stripes on the shield "represent the states joined in one compact union to support the Federal government, represented by the horizontal bar above". The Mint also noted that a shield was commonly used in paintings in the Capitol hallways painted by Constantino Brumidi, an artist in the Capitol active during the Lincoln Presidency. The obverse of the cent was also changed to a modern rendition of Brenner's design. The new Union Shield design replaces the Lincoln memorial in use since 1959. The coin was designed by artist Lyndall Bass and sculpted by U.S. Mint sculptor-engraver Joseph Menna. In January 2010, the coins were released early in Puerto Rico; this was caused by a shortage of 2009-dated pennies on the island. The new design was released at a ceremony at the Abraham Lincoln Presidential Library in Springfield, Illinois on February 11, 2010. In 2017, cents minted in Philadelphia were struck with a "P" mintmark to celebrate the 225th anniversary of the U.S. Mint. 2017 is the only year that Philadelphia cents have had a mintmark. In 2019, the United States Mint, the West Point Mint minted pennies marked with a "W" mintmark which was only available with proof sets, wrapped separately from the proof set in its own United States Mint plastic wrap.

Criticism of continued use

Proposals to eliminate

It has been suggested that the penny should be eliminated as a unit of currency for several reasons including that many Americans do not actually spend them, but rather only receive them in change at stores and proceed to return them to a bank for higher denomination currencies, or cash them in at coin counting kiosks. Most modern vending machines do not accept pennies, further diminishing their utility, and the production cost (figured in U.S. Dollars) now exceeds the face value of the coin, caused by increasing inflation. In 2001 and 2006, for example, United States Representative Jim Kolbe (R) of Arizona introduced bills which would have stopped production of pennies (in 2001, the Legal Tender Modernization Act, and in 2006, the Currency Overhaul for an Industrious Nation [COIN] Act).

In anticipation of the business of melting down U.S. pennies and U.S. nickels for profit, the U.S. Mint, which is a part of the US Department of the Treasury, implemented new regulations on December 14, 2006, which criminalize the melting of pennies and nickels and place limits on export of the coins. Violators can be punished with a fine of up to $10,000 USD and/or imprisoned for a maximum of five years.

Metal content and manufacturing costs
The price of metal drives the cost to manufacture a cent. The Secretary of the Treasury has authority to alter the percentage of copper and zinc in the one-cent coin if needed due to cost fluctuations. For years, the Mint's production and shipping costs for cents have exceeded the face value of the coin (the Mint's fixed costs and overhead, however, are absorbed by other circulating coins). As a result, the U.S. Treasury loses tens of millions of dollars every year producing cents. For example, the loss in 2013 was $55 million.

When copper reached a record high in February 2011, the melt value of a 95% copper cent was more than three times its face value. As of January 21, 2014, a pre-1982 cent contained 2.203 cents' worth of copper and zinc, making it an attractive target for melting by people wanting to sell the metals for profit. In comparison, post-1982 copper-plated zinc cents have a metallurgical value of only 0.552 cent.

Toxicity

Zinc, a major component of U.S. cents minted after mid-1982, is toxic in large quantities. Swallowing such a coin, which is 97.5% zinc, can cause damage to the stomach lining because of the high solubility of the zinc ion in the acidic stomach. Coins are the most commonly ingested foreign body in children but generally are allowed to pass spontaneously unless the patient is symptomatic. Zinc toxicity, mostly in the form of the ingestion of U.S. pennies minted after 1982, is commonly fatal in dogs where it causes a severe hemolytic anemia. It is also highly toxic in pet parrots and can often be fatal.

See also

 1909-S VDB Lincoln Cent
 1943 steel cent
 1955 doubled-die cent
 1974 aluminum cent
 Large cent (United States coin)
 Legal Tender Modernization Act
 Mill (currency)
 Penny (Canadian coin)
 Penny debate in the United States
 Ring cent
 Take a penny, leave a penny
 United States Mint coin production
 Lincoln cent mintage figures

References

External links

 "Penny Foolish", by David Margolick, The New York Times, February 11, 2007 – a brief popular history of the penny.
 Man tries to get rid of million pennies, USA Today, January 7, 2004.
 Examination of claim that "A U.S. penny costs more than a cent to manufacture" on Snopes.
 Top 10 Things You Didn't Know About the Penny – slideshow by Time Magazine
 U.S. Lincoln Penny on the Planet Mars – Curiosity Rover (September 10, 2012).
 PennyFreeBiz Grass Roots effort by retailers and merchants to stop using the penny. (June 2007).

Abraham Lincoln in art
One-cent coins of the United States
United States
1793 introductions